The 1993 European Cup Winners' Cup Final was a football match contested between Parma of Italy and Royal Antwerp of Belgium. The final was held at Wembley Stadium in London, England on 12 May 1993. It was the final match of the 1992–93 European Cup Winners' Cup and the 33rd European Cup Winners' Cup final. Parma beat Antwerp 3–1 and in doing so became the eighth different Italian team to win a European trophy.

The win gave Parma their first European trophy in their first European final; moreover, it was just their second season competing in European competition, and they were the first Italian team to appear in the final since Sampdoria, who appeared in consecutive years in 1989 and 1990. The most recent occasion on which a Belgian side had appeared in a Cup Winners' Cup final was in the second of Sampdoria's most recent appearances, in 1990. Sampdoria won the match 2–0 against Anderlecht, but needed extra time to do so. The 1993 edition also represented Antwerp's first appearance in a European final.

As the winners, Parma contested the 1993 European Super Cup against 1992–93 UEFA Champions League runners-up Milan, after champions Marseille had been banned from European competition over match-fixing allegations.

This was the last European club tournament final staged at the old Wembley, as it was going to be rebuilt to an all-new stadium.

Background
The 1993 final was the first meeting between Parma and Antwerp. Both sides went into the final chasing their first piece of European silverware and the match was the first time Parma faced Belgian opposition. Neither manager had previously led a team to a European final.

Wembley Stadium in London had hosted the European Cup Winners' Cup final on one previous occasion: in 1965. Londoners West Ham United won the game by two goals to nil against West German opposition 1860 Munich in front of 97,974 people, the biggest ever attendance at a Cup Winners' Cup final. Wembley is famous for playing host to FA Cup finals, as well as the 1966 FIFA World Cup Final.

Route to the final

Match

Summary
Parma opened the scoring in the 10th minute when goalkeeper Stevan Stojanović misjudged a corner that allowed Parma’s captain, Lorenzo Minotti to hook the ball home from the left of the penalty area. But Antwerp replied within two minutes, Alex Czerniatynski played a through-ball to Francis Severeyns who shot past the goalkeeper left footed to level the scores. The Italians began to dominate the game and Alessandro Melli headed them 2–1 ahead after half an hour after a cross from the right. The game was put beyond Antwerp six minutes from time when Stefano Cuoghi curled a shot past the goalkeeper from inside the area.

Details

See also
1992–93 European Cup Winners' Cup
1993 European Cup Final
1993 UEFA Cup Final
Parma Calcio 1913 in European football

External links
UEFA Cup Winners' Cup results at Rec.Sport.Soccer Statistics Foundation

3
Cup Winners' Cup Final 1993
Cup Winners' Cup Final 1993
UEFA Cup Winners' Cup Finals
UEFA
1993 sports events in London
May 1993 sports events in the United Kingdom
International club association football competitions hosted by London
Events at Wembley Stadium